Jocelyn Janneh (born 6 December 2002) is a Sierra Leonean professional footballer who plays as a defensive midfielder for Ligue 2 club Bastia.

Career
On 14 January 2022, Janneh joined the Turkish club Kayserispor, signing a three-year contract. He made his professional debut with Kayserispor as a late substitute in a 2–1 Süper Lig loss to Sivasspor on 21 May 2022.

On 23 July 2022, he transferred to the French Ligue 2 club Bastia, signing a three-year contract.

References

External links
 
 

2002 births
Living people
Sportspeople from Freetown
Sierra Leonean footballers
Association football midfielders
Süper Lig players
Kayserispor footballers
SC Bastia players
Sierra Leonean expatriate footballers
Sierra Leonean expatriate sportspeople in Turkey
Expatriate footballers in Turkey
Sierra Leonean expatriates in France
Expatriate footballers in France